"I Will Stand" is a song written by Mark Germino and Casey Beathard and recorded by American country music artist Kenny Chesney. It was released in August 1998 as the fourth and final single and title track from Chesney’s 1997 album of the same name.

Chart positions

References

1998 singles
1997 songs
Kenny Chesney songs
Songs written by Casey Beathard
Song recordings produced by Buddy Cannon
Song recordings produced by Norro Wilson
BNA Records singles